Chibou Amna is a Nigerien boxer. He competed in the men's flyweight event at the 1984 Summer Olympics.

References

External links

Year of birth missing (living people)
Living people
Nigerien male boxers
Olympic boxers of Niger
Boxers at the 1984 Summer Olympics
Place of birth missing (living people)
Flyweight boxers